Jerome Carle is the chief executive officer of Julphar. He is responsible for all aspects of Julphar's operations. He joined the company in January 2017 as the corporate CFO, before being appointed general manager in April 2017.

References

Living people
Year of birth missing (living people)
Place of birth missing (living people)
Nationality missing
Businesspeople in the pharmaceutical industry
Chief financial officers